Tuşba  is a new district and second level municipality in Van Province, Turkey. According to Law act no 6360, all Turkish provinces with a population more than 750,000 were declared a metropolitan municipality and the districts within the metropolitan municipalities  were transformed to second level municipalities. The law also creates new districts within the provinces in addition to present districts. On 30 March 2014, Fevzi Özgökçe (AKP) was elected mayor.

Thus after 2014 the present Van central district was split into two. A part was named Tuşba and the name Van was reserved for the metropolitan municipality. (Tuşpa was the capital of the 1st millennium BC Urartu kingdom  which was situated in Van.)

Rural area
There were 59 villages in the rural area of Tuşba district. Now their official status became "neighborhood of Tuşba".

References

Districts of Van Province
Kurdish settlements in Turkey